Nationality words link to articles with information on the nation's poetry or literature (for instance, Irish or France).

Events
c.1069
 Song poet and reforming official Wang Anshi removes poetry writing from the Imperial examination for the Chinese civil service

Works published

Births
Death years link to the corresponding "[year] in poetry" article. There are conflicting or unreliable sources for the birth years of many people born in this period; where sources conflict, the poet is listed again and the conflict is noted:

1060:
 Ava (died 1127), German poet

Deaths
Birth years link to the corresponding "[year] in poetry" article:

1060:
 Mei Yaochen (born 1002), Song poet

1067:
 Cai Xiang (born 1012), Song poet, calligrapher, scholar, official and structural engineer

See also

 Poetry
 11th century in poetry
 11th century in literature
 List of years in poetry

Other events:
 Other events of the 12th century
 Other events of the 13th century

11th century:
 11th century in poetry
 11th century in literature

Notes

11th-century poetry
Poetry